= Gentleman caller =

Gentleman caller may refer to:

- A male romantic suitor during a courtship
- The character in the Tennessee Williams play The Glass Menagerie (1944) and several Hollywood productions
